In English grammar, the personal pronoun you can often be used in the place of one, the fourth-person singular impersonal pronoun, in colloquial speech.

In English 
The generic you is primarily a colloquial substitute for one. For instance, 
"Brushing one's teeth is healthy"
can be expressed less formally as 
 "Brushing your teeth is healthy."

Generic pronouns in other languages

Germanic 
In German, the informal second-person singular personal pronoun  ("you")—just like in English—is sometimes used in the same sense as the indefinite pronoun  ("one").

In Dutch the informal second-person singular personal pronoun  ("you")—just like in English—is frequently used in the same sense as the indefinite pronoun  ("one").

Slavic 
In Russian, the second person is used for some impersonal constructions. Sometimes with the second-person singular pronoun , but often in the pronoun-dropped form. An example is the proverb  with the literal meaning "if you chase after two hares, you will not catch even one", or figuratively, "a bird in the hand is worth two in the bush".

Uralic 
The second-person pronoun  can be used in Finnish to replace passive voice, largely due to the influence of (generic) you in English, but its use is only recommended in spoken or otherwise informal language. A similar formation, though without the pronoun sinä and therefore only with the second-person possessive suffix -si, can be encountered in some dialects.

Arabic 
In Darija (Arabic as spoken in the Maghreb), there are two distinct singular second-person pronouns, one masculine (used when addressing a man) and one feminine (used when addressing a woman); but when used as generic pronouns, the speaker uses the pronoun with the gender corresponding to their own gender, rather than that of the person they are addressing.

Japonic 
In Japanese, the sentence structure may be adjusted to make the patient of an action, or even the action itself, the topic of a sentence, thus avoiding the use of a pronoun altogether.

See also 
 
 
 
 
 
 
  (you all, all of you)

References

Further reading
Merriam Webster's Dictionary of English Usage (E. Ward Gilman, ed.) Merriam-Webster, 1993. 

English usage controversies
Grammatical number
Modern English personal pronouns